Captain John Henry Cound Brunt,  (6 December 1922 – 10 December 1944) was an English recipient of the Victoria Cross, the highest award for gallantry in the face of the enemy that can be awarded to British and Commonwealth forces.

He served in the Italian campaign during the Second World War and was twice decorated for bravery in action before he was killed by mortar fire the day after his VC action.

Early life
John Henry Cound Brunt was born on 6 December 1922, on a farm in Priest Weston, near Chirbury, Shropshire to Thomas Henry Brunt and Nesta Mary Brunt (née Cound), and began his education at Chirbury village school. He had an elder sister named Dorothy (born 13 May 1920) and a younger sister Isobel (born 5 October 1923). When Dorothy was eight, the family moved to a farm near Whittington, Shropshire, where John grew up. As he became older, his fearless nature became more apparent; every week, he read the comic Tiny Tots, which featured instructions on "How to teach yourself to swim". One day, he asked Dorothy to take him to the Shropshire Canal, which went through their farmland. Before his sister could stop him, Brunt had taken off all his clothes and jumped into the canal. When they finally arrived home, their mother wanted to know why he had no clothes on, and John responded that he had been teaching himself to swim.

When old enough, Brunt was enrolled at Ellesmere College, where his mischievous streak became quickly apparent through pranks and dares; once, while in the sanatorium with mumps, he slipped a laxative into the matron's tea. Nevertheless, he is fondly remembered at the school. It was while he was at Ellesmere that he contracted measles, resulting in his need to wear glasses. An enthusiastic sportsman, Brunt played cricket, hockey, rugby, water polo and wrestling. He was the only pupil at the school to tackle the headmaster while playing rugby, injuring the older man's knee in the process.

In 1934, the Brunt family moved to Paddock Wood in Kent and, in his school holidays, "Young John" (as he was known in the village) would come home. Although he was still a reckless individual, he was thought of very highly, and helped train the Paddock Wood Home Guard between 1940 and 1943, assisted by his father. He spent his last days in Paddock Wood helping with the hop harvest.

Military career

Brunt joined the British Army when he left school, training as a private soldier with the Queen's Own Royal West Kent Regiment in 1941, during the Second World War. He received a commission as a second lieutenant on 2 January 1943, and was posted to North Africa. Although he was commissioned in the Sherwood Foresters, he never served with them, instead being posted to the 6th Battalion, Lincolnshire Regiment (6th Lincolns), a Territorial Army (TA) unit, having become friendly with Captain Alan Money, an officer in the Lincolns, on the boat to North Africa. The battalion was part of the 138th Infantry Brigade of the 46th Infantry Division. The division was then commanded by Major General John Hawkesworth.

On 9 September 1943, Brunt's battalion landed at Salerno as part of the Allied invasion of Italy and Brunt, now a lieutenant, was given command of No.9 Platoon in 'A' Company. The unit subsequently moved south-east to establish a base in a farm near the river Asa.

Military Cross
Between December 1943 and January 1944, during the Bernhardt Line fighting, Brunt commanded a battle patrol and saw near-constant action. In efforts to break the enemy line, he crossed and re-crossed the river so many times that the troops took to calling it "Brunt's Brook". After an intense five-minute bombardment, Brunt led a section into an assault. The first two houses contained two enemy soldiers, but it was the third house that provided the most resistance. Using grenades and Tommy guns, they managed to kill eight enemy troops outside the house, as well as those inside, all belonging to the 1st Battalion, 2nd Hermann Goering Panzer Grenadier Regiment. After thirty minutes of intense fighting, the patrol withdrew, having had one man killed and six wounded. While the rest of the section pulled back, Brunt remained behind with his sergeant and a private to retrieve a wounded soldier. For his actions, he was awarded the Military Cross (MC).

On 5 January 1944, Brunt was in a sick bed in a rear hospital. He pleaded with doctors to be allowed to leave to take part in an attack, and was given permission, leading his patrol under heavy fire. He was back in the hospital 24 hours later with concussion after a piece of shrapnel almost split his helmet, but would have carried on fighting if it had not been for a non-commissioned officer (NCO), who forcibly led him away from the front line. At the end of the campaign, Brunt is said to have commented to his friends, "I've won the MC, now for the VC!"

Victoria Cross
Brunt's division left Italy in March 1944, and was sent to Syria and Egypt to rest and retrain, before returning to Italy in July 1944. Having been promoted to temporary captain, Brunt was appointed second-in-command (2IC) of 'D' Company. By early December 1944, after being engaged in heavy fighting in the Gothic Line offensive, the battalion was operating near Ravenna, fighting German troops who were retreating north through Italy. On the night of 3 December, the battalion began their attack on the town of Faenza. By the evening of 6 December, they had taken the village of Ragazzina near Faenza, and after heavy fighting the 6th Lincolns established defensive positions in Faenza itself. For his actions during the engagement, Brunt was awarded the Victoria Cross (VC). The full citation for the award appeared in a supplement to the London Gazette of 6 February 1945, reading:

The next morning, having won the battle and the acclaim of his regiment, Captain Brunt was as eager to return to the offensive, keeping alert for more trouble as breakfast was being prepared for the men, their first meal in 48 hours. He was standing in the doorway of the platoon headquarters, having a mug of tea and chatting with friends, when a stray German mortar bomb landed at his feet, killing him outright. He had celebrated his 22nd birthday just four days before.

John Brunt is buried at Faenza War Cemetery in Italy under a Commonwealth War Grave headstone; his VC was announced posthumously in February 1945.

Victoria Cross presentation
On 18 December 1945, King George VI presented Brunt's VC and MC to his parents at Buckingham Palace. Brunt's father met Field Marshal Sir Harold Alexander, the Commander-in-Chief (C-in-C) of the Allied Armies in Italy (AAI, later redesignated 15th Army Group) throughout most of the Italian Campaign, at the ceremony and said to him "I expect that you know many men who should have been awarded this medal", to which Alexander replied "No, because there is always only one who will do the unexpected and that day it was your son."

Legacy

In 1946, John Brunt's sister Dorothy gave birth to a boy which she named John Brunt Miller, in honour of his  uncle.

On 3 September 1947 the Kent Arms public house in Paddock Wood, Kent, was renamed the John Brunt V.C. in his honour. In 1997, the pub's name was  changed to The Hopping Hooden Horse; after local outrage the former name was restored in 2001. Behind the pub a small housing development called John Brunt VC Court was built.

During his military career, Brunt was awarded the VC, MC, 1939-45 Star, Africa Star, Italy Star and the British War Medal 1939–1945, all of which are on display in Royal Lincolnshire Regiment and Lincolnshire Yeomanry Collections in the Museum of Lincolnshire Life in Lincoln. In 1951 an altar rail in the Soldiers' Chapel of St George in Lincoln Cathedral was dedicated to his memory by the regiment.

On 17 July 1965 The Victor comic featured a cover story named Brunt V.C., a two-page strip based on the actions that won Brunt the VC.

A John Brunt Memorial Cricket Pavilion was opened at Ellesmere College in 1970, after funds were raised for it since 1945. The college's ante-chapel holds a photograph of Brunt with a copy of his VC citation displayed below.

In May 2004 an outdoor plaque to his memory was unveiled in Priestweston.

Notes

References

External links
Lincolnshire Regiment VCs (Royal Lincolnshire & Royal Anglian Regimental Association (Lincoln Branch))

1922 births
1944 deaths
People educated at Ellesmere College
British Army personnel killed in World War II
British World War II recipients of the Victoria Cross
Recipients of the Military Cross
Sherwood Foresters officers
Queen's Own Royal West Kent Regiment soldiers
British Army recipients of the Victoria Cross
People from Paddock Wood
Military personnel from Shropshire